Akbulut is a Turkish name meaning "white cloud." It may refer to:

People with the surname
 Ahmet Ziya Akbulut, Turkish painter
 Gökay Akbulut, German politician
 Oğuz Akbulut (born 1992), Turkish para-athlete
 Selman Akbulut, Turkish mathematician
 Ural Akbulut, Turkish professor of chemistry
 Yıldırım Akbulut (1935–2021), Turkish politician
 Yusuf Akbulut, Syriac Orthodox priest

Places
 Akbulut, Aydıntepe, a village in the district of Aydıntepe, Bayburt Province, Turkey
 Akbulut, Eldivan, a village in the district of Eldivan, Çankırı Province, Turkey
 Akbulut, Palu

Other
 Akbulut cork, a structure in topology

Turkish-language surnames